Chapel Hill is an unincorporated community in Covington County, Alabama, United States, located on State Route 54, northeast of Florala.

References

Unincorporated communities in Covington County, Alabama
Unincorporated communities in Alabama